Nicola Lai (born 17 January 1986) is an Italian footballer who plays as a midfielder.

Career
Born in Cagliari, Sardinia, Lai was sold to Rieti in co-ownership deal. In June 2007, Cagliari decided to give up the remain registration rights to Rieti. In July 2007, he joined Sardinian side Torres.

He then played for non-professional side Muravera for a season (at league Promozione), and in 2009-10 season signed for Algero, which the club had former Cagliari team-mate Alessio Cossu, Andrea Cocco, Andrea Peana and Simone Aresti.

But in November 2009, he was released along with Massimiliano Farrugia.

References

External links
 Profile at AIC.Football.it 
 

Italian footballers
Cagliari Calcio players
Association football midfielders
Sportspeople from Cagliari
1986 births
Living people
Footballers from Sardinia
Pol. Alghero players